Bulbophyllum mirum is a species of orchid in the genus Bulbophyllum. Its natural distribution is peninsular Thailand, Malaysia, and on Sumatra, Java, Borneo and the Lesser Sunda Islands of Indonesia.

References

The Bulbophyllum-Checklist
The Internet Orchid Species Photo Encyclopedia

mirum